Eygalières (Provençal: Aigalieras) is a commune in the Bouches-du-Rhône department, southern France.

Population

See also
 Alpilles
 Jardin de l'alchimiste
 Communes of the Bouches-du-Rhône department

References

External links
 Website about Eygalières

Communes of Bouches-du-Rhône
Bouches-du-Rhône communes articles needing translation from French Wikipedia